The Tandanya National Aboriginal Cultural Institute, usually referred to as Tandanya, is an art museum located on Grenfell Street in Adelaide, South Australia. It specialises in promoting Indigenous Australian art, including visual art, music and storytelling. It is the oldest Aboriginal-owned and -run cultural centre in Australia.

Naming

The institute derives its name from Tarndanya, the Kaurna Aboriginal people's name for the Adelaide city centre and parklands area, meaning "place of the red kangaroo".

History

Tandanya is the oldest Aboriginal-owned and -run cultural centre in Australia, opened in 1989. The first exhibition featured artworks on silk created by women from Utopia in the Northern Territory, entitled Utopia — A Picture Story.

Building
It is housed in the old Grenfell Street Power Station (later a TAFE college) at the eastern end of Grenfell Street in the Adelaide city centre, also the office headquarters of the South Australian Electric Light and Motive Power Company. The original building dates from 1901, but it was extensively modified and rebuilt in 1912–13, including the Palladian-style facade. The building was heritage-listed on the SA Heritage Register in November 1984. There is an "Historic Engineering Plaque" on a ground level plinth just east of the north-east corner of the building, which was dedicated by the Institution of Engineers, Australia, the Electricity Trust of South Australia and the Adelaide City Council on 6 April 1995.

Governance and functions
Its core activities, as listed in the 2015-6 Annual Report, are: visual arts (exhibitions program); performing arts (events, theatre and performances); community arts (public art); cultural performances and information; school education activities; cultural and artistic tours; Indigenous infused café; Gallery Shop retailing Aboriginal & Torres Strait Islander Artworks. The centre is governed by a 10-member Board of Aboriginal and/or Torres Strait Islander descent and residing in South Australia. A Chief executive officer is responsible for its day-to-day operations.

, Dennis Stokes, who is of the Wardaman, Luritja and Warramunga peoples of the Northern Territory as well as the Wagadagam people of the Torres Strait Islands, is CEO. He is also a member of the South Australian Film Corporation's First Nations Advisory Committee, launched in November 2020 as part of their First Nations Screen Strategy 2020-2025. 

Funding is through the Australia Council for the Arts.

21st-century activities
The centre runs programs and performances as part of NAIDOC Week.

Since 2015 the centre has hosted the annual Art Fair, part of the Tarnanthi Festival of Contemporary Aboriginal and Torres Strait Islander Art each year.

2020
In 2020, with its 30th-anniversary celebrations interrupted by being forced to close for over six months due to the COVID-19 pandemic in Australia, Tandanya re-opened in October with an exhibition called Atnwengerrp — Our Apmere, Our Place, which included the work of five of the original women whose work was shown in the first ever exhibition at the gallery.

On 13 November 2020, as part of NAIDOC Week celebrations, the centre hosted a new music festival called TREATY, featuring established and emerging First Nations musicians from South Australia. Performers included J-Milla, Sonz of Serpent, Dem Mob, RKM (Rulla Kelly-Mansell), Tilly Tjala Thomas, MRLN (Marlon Motlop) and Katie Aspel, with Natasha Wanganeen sharing the presenting with J-Milla.

Discussions have been taking place with regard to the new Aboriginal Art and Cultures Centre (AACC)  as part of the Lot Fourteen precinct on North Terrace, with a planned opening in 2025.

See also
 List of music museums
Tarndanyangga

References

External links
Official website

Art museums and galleries in South Australia
Arts in Adelaide
Australian Aboriginal art
Museums in Adelaide
Organisations serving Indigenous Australians
Art museums established in 1989
1989 establishments in Australia
Culture of Adelaide